The 164th Division(2nd Formation) was created in October 1950 basing on the Security Division of Northeastern Military Region. 

In July 1950 502nd Infantry Regiment of the inactivating 168th Division was attached to the division.

In January 1952 the division was disbanded. Its divisional HQ was absorbed into 3rd Armored Troops Tank Organization Base, while its regiments were renamed as 3rd, 5th and 6th Independent Infantry Regiments of Northeastern Military Districts, respectively.

References

中国人民解放军各步兵师沿革，http://blog.sina.com.cn/s/blog_a3f74a990101cp1q.html

Infantry divisions of the People's Liberation Army
Military units and formations established in 1950
Military units and formations disestablished in 1952